Salinas Valley Samba was an American soccer team based in Salinas, California, United States. Founded in 2004, the team played in the Western Division of the National Premier Soccer League (NPSL), a national amateur league at the fourth tier of the American Soccer Pyramid.

The team spent the majority of its history playing on the campus of Salinas High School, though they moved to Watsonville High School in nearby Santa Cruz County, for their final season in 2009. The team's colors were silver, black and white.

History

The Samba joined the Men's Premier Soccer League in 2004, one of five expansion teams for the league's second season. They joined along with the Albuquerque Asylum, the Sonoma County Sol, the Sacramento Knights, and the Idaho Wolves. During their first season of play, the Samba finished the league in 5th place, five points behind the Utah Salt Ratz, who ultimately finished the season as league champions.

The 2005 season saw the development of location-specific conferences as more teams were added to the league. This placed Salinas Valley in the Western Conference, with a majority of California teams (with the exception of the Las Vegas Strikers and the Albuquerque Asylum) The expansion of the league in 2006 brought further development of the conferences, as the Western Conference split into "Northwestern" and "Southwestern", and a Midwestern conference was added. The Salinas Valley Samba are currently in the Northwestern Conference.

The Samba finished the 2005 season in 4th place. Also in 2005 the Samba advanced to the second round of the Lamar Hunt U.S. Open Cup before being defeated by the Seattle Sounders.

In 2006, they finished the year in 6th place.

Players

Last roster
as at June 7, 2009

Notable former players
  David Estrada
  Yuri Morales
  Nate Northup
  Adam Smarte

Year-by-year

Head coaches
  Artie Cairel (2004–2008)
  Mark Cisneros (2009)

Stadia
 "The Pit" at Salinas High School; Salinas, California (2004–2008)
 Stadium at Watsonville High School; Watsonville, California (2009)

External links
Salinas Valley Samba
NPSL at The American Soccer History Archives
The Samba sensation – team loaded with Santa Cruz players June 8, 2005
USOpenCup.com standings for 2005
Sounders dance past Samba

Soccer clubs in California
National Premier Soccer League teams
Sports in Salinas, California
Association football clubs established in 2004
2004 establishments in California
Sports in Monterey County, California